The 1997 Halloween Havoc  was the ninth annual Halloween Havoc professional wrestling pay-per-view (PPV) event produced by World Championship Wrestling (WCW). It took place on October 26, 1997, from the MGM Grand Garden Arena in the Las Vegas suburb of Paradise, Nevada for the second consecutive year.

The event is notable for the Rey Mysterio Jr. vs. Eddie Guerrero title vs. mask match for the WCW Cruiserweight Championship, which is considered both one of the best matches in WCW history, and one of the best matches of the 1990s. 

In 2014, all of WCW's Halloween Havoc PPVs became available on WWE's streaming service, the WWE Network.

Production

Background
Halloween Havoc was an annual professional wrestling pay-per-view event produced by World Championship Wrestling (WCW) since 1989. As the name implies, it was a Halloween-themed show held in October. The 1997 event was the ninth event in the Halloween Havoc chronology and it took place on October 26, 1997, from the MGM Grand Garden Arena in the Las Vegas suburb of Paradise, Nevada for the second consecutive year.

Storylines
The event featured professional wrestling matches that involve different wrestlers from pre-existing scripted feuds and storylines. Professional wrestlers portray villains, heroes, or less distinguishable characters in the scripted events that build tension and culminate in a wrestling match or series of matches.

Event

The third match was for the Cruiserweight title between Eddie Guerrero and Rey Mysterio with the added stipulation that if Mysterio lost he would no longer be allowed to wrestle wearing a luchador mask. Mysterio won the match after he managed to counter Guerrero's crucifix powerbomb off the second rope into a Hurricanrana for the pin.

The fourth match pitted Alex Wright against Steve McMichael, with Wright being a replacement for the departed Jeff Jarrett. Goldberg attacked McMichael during the match, hit the Jackhammer on him, and placed Wright on top of him for the pin. After the match Goldberg was given McMichael's Super Bowl XX championship ring by McMichael's ex-wife Debra and then attacked Wright in the ring.

Ric Flair challenged Curt Hennig for the United States Championship. Flair wrapped Hennig in a tree of woe, put the title belt over Hennig's head, and kicked the center plate into his face to cause a disqualification.

Next was the match between Scott Hall and Lex Luger with Larry Zbyszko as the special guest referee. Hall originally defeated Luger by giving him the Outsiders Edge after Syxx interfered and kicked Luger in the head as Zbyszko was arguing with Eric Bischoff. He then began celebrating in the ring with Bischoff and Syxx and forced Zbyszko to raise his hand in victory.

Zbyszko, meanwhile, suspected the nWo had played a role in Hall's victory and called for a replay of the match's ending. Once he saw what Syxx had done, Zbyszko restarted the match. Hall began arguing with Zbyszko once back in the ring, and Zbyszko shoved him into a waiting Luger. Luger then placed Hall in the Torture Rack and Hall submitted. As Zbyszko called for the bell Syxx attacked him, only to be put in a gogoplata followed by a guillotine choke. Bischoff and Hall then returned to the ring and attacked Zbyszko, ending with Bischoff kicking Zbyszko in the head and Hall counting a pin.

Randy Savage defeated Diamond Dallas Page in a last man standing match after a fake Sting (Hollywood Hogan) hit Page with a baseball bat. The only way to win the match was to have your opponent not answer the referee's count of 10.

In the main event, held inside a steel cage, Roddy Piper beat Hogan by technical submission with a sleeper hold. Randy Savage interfered by climbing into the cage and he and Hogan beat down Piper following the match. After the match, a fan climbed into the cage and was beat up by Savage and Hogan.

Reception
In 2017, Kevin Pantoja of 411Mania gave the event a rating of 6.0 [Average], stating, "One of the better WCW Pay-Per-Views I can recall from this era. It still suffered from the same issues (fun undercard with a bad main event) but had more positives. For one, you can’t miss Guerrero/Mysterio. It is required viewing. Nagata/Dragon and DDP/Savage were both strong matches. Gedo/Jericho is alright too. There are a few stinkers (Mongo/Wright, Disco/Jackie and Hogan/Piper) but the good manages to outweigh the bad on this particular night."

Results

References

Holidays themed professional wrestling events
Halloween Havoc
Professional wrestling shows in the Las Vegas Valley
Events in Paradise, Nevada
1997 in Nevada
October 1997 events in the United States
1997 World Championship Wrestling pay-per-view events